The Lujiazui Finance City China Squash Open 2012 is the women's edition of the 2012 China Squash Open, which is a tournament of the WSA World Tour event International (Prize money: $55,000). The event took place in Shanghai in China from 25 October to 28 October. Low Wee Wern won her second China Squash Open trophy, beating Joelle King in the final.

Prize money and ranking points
For 2012, the prize purse was $55,000. The prize money and points breakdown is as follows:

Seeds

Draw and results

See also
WSA World Tour 2012
China Squash Open

References

External links
WSA Lujiazui Finance City China Squash Open 2012 website
WISPA Lujiazui Finance City China Squash Open 2012 website

Squash tournaments in China
China Squash Open
China Squash Open